In Times Before the Light is the debut album by Norwegian black metal band Covenant, released in 1997 through Mordgrimm.

Album history
In Times Before the Light is the first album by the band (at that time called Covenant), recorded in 1995. The only members at the time were Nagash and Blackheart. The album is considered to be symphonic black metal and provided Covenant a good fan base in Norway. The album was created when Nagash and Blackheart were about 17 years of age. The release was significantly delayed due to loss of album artwork in shipment to the record company.

A re-recorded version of In Times Before the Light was released in 2002 through Hammerheart Records due to Nagash and Blackheart (now 'Lex Icon' and 'Psy Coma') citing that they were not satisfied with the original release. Covenant were also forced to change their name to The Kovenant due to a dispute with a Swedish electronic band of the same name. The outcome is significantly different from the original; an industrial version of the original symphonic black metal album. The remixed tracks are longer, various elements were added to them and many parts were re-recorded.

The album was re-released on 26 January 2007 through VME/Head Not Found as In Times Before the Light 1995, with tracks from their 1994 demo From the Storm of Shadows as bonus content. The material was remastered by Tom Kvalsvoll at Strype Audio.

On 29 October 2011, Nagash did a one-time only performance of the entire album at the Aurora Infernalis III festival in Arnhem, Netherlands. Except for Nagash, no other members of the current incarnation of the band participated.

On 11 October 2016, Aurora Infernalis announced that an LP of the original album would be released. Since the album was never released as an LP the record label decided that "in January 2017 it will be out on 180gr gatefold LP with a 12-page full color booklet. It is limited to 666 copies (466 black, 200 splatter) and comes with the original artwork that was lost back in the day. Kutargic made the artwork in 1995, but it was never used on the different CD versions." This LP will contain an original artwork.

Track listing

Personnel
 N. Blackheart – vocals, drums, keyboards
 T. Blackheart – guitars, bass, keyboards

2002 remix
 Lex Icon – vocals, drums
 Psy Coma – guitars, bass, keyboards, programming 
Guests
 Sensei Bogus – additional bass, additional programming
Other
 Pål Espen Johannessen – engineering
 Psy Coma – producer, recording
 Bjørn Boge – producer, mixing, engineering, additional recording, drum editing
 Tommy Svensson – artwork, layout
 Peder Klingwall – photography

2007 remaster
 N. Blackheart – vocals, drums, keyboards
 T. Blackheart – guitars, bass, keyboards
 Kharon – Bass (on tracks 11–13)

Other information

Engineered by Sire Johannesen; produced by both Covenant and Sire Johannesen
Digitally mastered at The Exchange; executive production by Noctis Irae
All symphonies arranged and composed by Covenant during the period 1992–1995
All poetry penned by Covenant between the years 1993–1995
Cover painting by Alex Kurtagić
Logo by Christophe Szpajdel
Portraits taken by Close Up
Art design conceived by Covenant
Layout and design executed by Digitalis

References

1997 debut albums
The Kovenant albums